clop (subculture)
hoof
Clopper-Pearson interval
Clopper Lake
Clopper Road

See also
Iris Clops
Ol' Clip-Clop
Spy Clops